Kalabaydh, also spelled Kalabayr, is a town in eastern Sool region of Somaliland.

Overview
Local control is disputed between Somaliland, Puntland and Khatumo State (formerly HBM-SSC or Hoggaanka Badbaadada iyo Mideynta SSC).

Education
Kalabaydh has a number of academic institutions. According to the Puntland Ministry of Education, there are 8 primary schools in the Kalabaydh District. Among these are Kalabayr Primary, Saaxdheer, Xidh-Xidh and Qorilay. Secondary schools in the area include Kalabayr Secondary.

Demographics
The town is inhabited by the Dhulbahante clan, with it primarily inhabited by lineages belonging to the Bahararsame sub-clan of the Farah Garad.

Notes

References
Kalabaydh

Populated places in Sool, Somaliland